Nettles or Nettle is a locational surname of British origin, which means a person from a place overgrown with nettles. The name may refer to:

Bea Nettles (born 1946), American photographer
Bill Nettles (born 1961), American lawyer
Bob Nettle (born 1924), American politician
Bonnie Nettles (1928–1985), American cult founder
Clem Nettles (1930-2010), American farmer and politician
Doug Nettles (born 1951), American football player
Geoffrey Nettle (born 1950), Australian judge
Graig Nettles (born 1944), American baseball player
Jennifer Nettles (born 1974), American singer
Jim Nettles (born 1947), American baseball player
Jim Nettles (football player) (born 1942), American football player
John Nettles (born 1943), British actor
Kerry Nettle (born 1973), Australian politician
Morris Nettles (born 1952), American baseball player
Ray Nettles (born 1949), American football player
Stephen Nettles (1595–1647), British Anglican priest

See also 
Kopřiva, a Czech surname meaning nettle

References

English-language surnames
Surnames of British Isles origin